Stephen Kaufer (Steve Kaufer; born in 1962 or 1963 in Hollywood, California) was the founder and CEO of TripAdvisor. Kaufer launched TripAdvisor in 2000 with Langley Steinert, and was the company's president and chief executive officer from then until his retirement in 2022.

Early life

Kaufer was born in Hollywood, California, which, he has written, is "truly a shocking notion if you know how unstruck I am by stars." His father, Alvin Kaufer, was an accomplished trial lawyer, who had grown up in an Orthodox Jewish household, but raised his own children in a Reform Jewish culture. Steve's mother had multiple sclerosis and was wheelchair bound by the time he was 13 and bedridden by the time he went to college. As the first of three children, he had to take on a lot responsibility, including, from the time he was 13, balancing the household checkbook. When he was 15, he obtained a special driver's license, enabling him to ferry his siblings around. His mother died in 1986.  

As a trial lawyer, Steve's father had always impressed on him the value of "articulate persuasion" and regularly engaged his eldest child in rigorous, dinner-table debate. As Stephen later recalled, "He would argue me into a corner, then at some point say, 'Switch!,' and I’d have to defend the opposite position. He would then deftly argue himself out of the corner he had just painted me into."

Steve also took up fencing in high school and competed in the Junior Olympics at 16. There, he said, "[I] lost every bout. But I got better." Later, as an undergraduate at Harvard University, he made the varsity fencing team, eventually becoming its captain. 

At the outset of his college years at Harvard, Steve thought he would major in physics, but, he recalls, "I liked the pulleys-and-levers part, but not the extensive math." So, he ended up majoring in computer science, which he later described as "a bit of a backwater in academia then, but I liked the game of solving programming problems."

Early career

In 1985, after he had graduated from college, he co-founded CenterLine Software, a company that made programming and testing tools for software developers. In 1998, he and his co-owners sold half the assets, and the other half became CenterLine Development Systems, which his wife, Caroline Kaufer, headed.

TripAdvisor

That same year, when he and his wife were planning a vacation in Mexico, he discovered, with frustration, how difficult it was to find online any unbiased information and candid opinions about specific hotels. Instead, he encountered, over and over, the glossy (probably retouched) PR photos and standard gushing descriptions, provided by the properties themselves.

Later Caroline suggested he build a Web site to help other travelers in similar predicaments. “Just keep it easy to use and honest,” he remembers her saying. But he back-burnered the idea, not acting on it for more than a year.

When he finally launched such a site, a few years later, his initial plan flopped because he was trying a business-to-business approach, partnering with other travel-related websites, instead of engaging directly with travelers. But, eventually, he landed on a winning formula: make TripAdvisor available to everyone (not business to business), aggregate tons of information about hotels and attractions, encourage travelers to provide personal reviews, and structure contracts so that his company would earn a fee from travel companies every time a TripAdivsor user clicked to their sites (whether or not it ended in a sale). As the company grew, Steve remained at the helm, declining a sale to Yahoo and later leading TripAdvisor through a $210 million sale to IAC/InterActiveCorp, followed, in 2011, by a multi-billion dollar IPO. As of 2022, the site drew more than 400 million visitors per month. In 2022, Steve stepped down after 22 years as TripAdvisor's CEO. At age 59, however, he was already gearing up for another venture—"I think," he said, "I still have one more start-up in me."

Personal life

His wife, Caroline, did not live to see TripAdvisor's full growth and success. She died from pancreatic neuroendocrine cancer in 2005 at age 42, leaving Steve to raise their four children, then aged 13, 12, 7, and 5. In 2012, he remarried a woman with four kids of her own. 

Through launching the Stephen and Caroline Kaufer Fund for Neuroendocrine Research (and contributing generously to the Caring for Carcinoid Foundation), he has supported medical research related to his wife's devastating illness. 

In July 2021, his estimated Net Worth was $54.3 Million.

Kaufer is known as a longtime critic of Google for its "dominance in Internet gatekeeping".

Regarding his own relationship with travel, he has said, "Most people assume I'm an avid traveler who'd like nothing more than to roam the world for three months. Not true. [TripAdvisor] was born of an average traveler’s desire to plan a great trip for a precious week or two of vacation time."

References

See also  
 Rich Barton
 Glen Fogel

Living people
American chief executives
Year of birth missing (living people)
Harvard College alumni